Pacific Career Technology High School (PCTHS) (also known as Pacific High School) is a high school in the Twin Rivers Unified School District located in North Highlands, California.

References

External links
 

Public high schools in California
High schools in Sacramento County, California
1981 establishments in California